The Battle of Toulouse was fought between the Visigoths and the Western Roman Empire in 458. The battle was part of a great mid-winter expedition made across the alps by Emperor Majorian, taking a large army from Italy into Gaul with the goal of restoring the region to Roman rule after the disastrous reign of Avitus. Majorian and the Visigothic king Theodoric II fought a battle at Toulouse, in which the Visigoths were defeated. Majorian thereafter secured the cooperation of the Visigoths against the Suebi in Spain. However, fighting resumed, and Theodoric was finally defeated at Orléans in 463.

See also
 Battle of Toulouse (439)

Sources
 

458
Military history of France
Toulouse
Toulouse
Toulouse
Toulouse